Woody Shaw: The Complete Muse Sessions is a 7-CD box set compilation of recordings by jazz trumpeter, composer and bandleader Woody Shaw, released in 2013 by Mosaic Records.

The box set includes all nine of Woody Shaw's albums for Muse Records that were originally released during the periods between 1974–1977 and 1983–1987. The collection features an accompanying booklet written by Shaw's son, Woody Louis Armstrong Shaw III, who co-produced the set. Includes new photographs and remastered sound by Malcolm Addey.

Reception

Matt Collar of AllMusic stated that the Muse albums "represent not only some of the most important recordings of Shaw's career, but some of the most influential and individualistic artistic statements by a jazz artist in the 20th century."

CD and Track Listing

References

2011 compilation albums
Woody Shaw compilation albums
Mosaic Records compilation albums
Albums produced by Michael Cuscuna